Angela Dawn Craig (born February 14, 1972) is an American politician, retired journalist, and former businesswoman. A member of the Democratic–Farmer–Labor Party (DFL), she has served as the U.S. representative from  since 2019. The district includes most of the southern suburbs of the Twin Cities and some outlying rural areas.

Born and raised in Arkansas, Craig worked in journalism and corporate communications. She moved to Minnesota in 2005 for a job at St. Jude Medical. Craig first ran for Congress in 2016, losing to Jason Lewis, whom she defeated in their 2018 rematch.

Craig is the first openly LGBT+ member of Congress from Minnesota and the first lesbian mother to serve in Congress.

Early life and career
Craig was born in West Helena, Arkansas, in 1972. She graduated from Nettleton High School in Jonesboro and earned a bachelor's degree in journalism from the University of Memphis.

After college, Craig interned at The Commercial Appeal and became a full-time reporter. She lived in London from 2002 through 2005, and worked at St. Jude Medical in human resources and communications from 2005 to 2017.

U.S. House of Representatives

Elections

2016 

She announced her candidacy before Republican incumbent John Kline announced his retirement. She faced no opposition in the Democratic primary. In the general election, she faced former conservative talk show host Jason Lewis. She lost by fewer than 7,000 votes.

2018 

Craig sought a rematch with Lewis in 2018. As in 2016, she was unopposed in the Democratic primary. In the general election, she defeated Lewis, whose candor was felt to be his eventual undoing. Regarding slavery, for instance, he said in 2016, "If you don't want to own a slave, don't, but don't tell other people they can't."
 
Craig is the first openly lesbian mother to be elected to Congress, the first woman to be elected in Minnesota's 2nd district, and the first openly gay person elected to Congress from Minnesota. She received 52.6% of the vote, winning three of the six counties in the district. When she took office on January 3, 2019, she became the first DFLer to represent this district since it was reconfigured as a south suburban district in 2003.

2020 

In a verified recording, Legal Marijuana Now Party nominee Adam Weeks said that Republican operatives offered him $15,000 to run for Congress in the 2nd district in order to "pull votes away" from Craig. Weeks said, "They want me to run as a third-party, liberal candidate, which I'm down. I can play the liberal, you know that." Leaders of prominent pro-marijuana legalization groups Minnesotans for Responsible Marijuana Regulation, Sensible Change Minnesota, and Minnesota NORML condemned the GOP strategy as "unconscionable".

In late September, Weeks died of a drug overdose, throwing the election into chaos. Minnesota law requires a special election if a major-party nominee dies within 79 days of Election Day. The law was enacted to prevent a repeat of the circumstances of the 2002 U. S. Senate election, in which incumbent Paul Wellstone died 11 days before the general election. Since the Legal Marijuana Now Party was a major party in Minnesota (by virtue of its 2018 candidate for state auditor winning five percent of the vote), the 2nd District race was set to be postponed to February 9, 2021. Craig sued to keep the election on November 3, arguing that the requirement for a special election could leave the 2nd district without representation for almost a month, and also violated federal election law. Republican nominee Tyler Kistner joined the Minnesota Secretary of State as a defendant. The federal judge hearing the case ruled for Craig, noting that federal election law barred moving the date of House elections in all but a few circumstances. Kistner appealed to the Eighth Circuit Court of Appeals, which also sided with Craig. The appeals court held that the death of a candidate from a party with "modest electoral strength" could not justify postponing the election. After Kistner's appeal to the Supreme Court was rejected, the election was cleared to continue as scheduled on November 3.

2022 

In the 2022 election, Craig defeated Republican nominee Tyler Kistner in a rematch of the 2020 election with 51% of the vote.

Tenure
According to the McCourt School of Public Policy at Georgetown University, Craig held a Bipartisan Index Score of 0.3 in the 116th United States Congress for 2019, placing her 114th out of 435 members.

During Donald Trump's presidency, Craig voted in line with Trump's stated position 5.5% of the time. As of June 2022, Craig had voted in line with Joe Biden's stated position 100% of the time.

On February 25, 2022, Craig introduced the Affordable Insulin Now Act, a bill intended to cap out-of-pocket insulin prices at $35 per month. The bill passed the House.

COVID-19 policy
On February 1, 2023, Craig was one of 12 Democrats to vote for a resolution to end the COVID-19 national emergency.

Committee assignments

 Committee on Agriculture
 Subcommittee on Commodity Exchanges, Energy, and Credit
 Subcommittee on Livestock and Foreign Agriculture
 Subcommittee on General Farm Commodities and Risk Management
 Committee on Energy and Commerce
Subcommittee on Communications & Technology
Subcommittee on Consumer Protection & Commerce
Subcommittee on Health
 Committee on Small Business
 Rural Development, Agriculture, Trade, and Entrepreneurship
 Subcommittee on Investigations, Oversight and Regulations

Past 

 Committee on Transportation and Infrastructure (2019–2021)

Caucus memberships

 Congressional LGBT Equality Caucus (Co-chair)
 Congressional Progressive Caucus (2019-2021)
 New Democrat Coalition
 House Pro-Choice Caucus

Electoral history

Personal life
In 2020, Craig moved to Prior Lake, Minnesota, after living in Eagan, Minnesota, for nearly 10 years. She and her wife, Cheryl Greene, have four sons who were teenagers during her first run for Congress in 2016.

Craig is a Lutheran.

Physical assault
Craig was physically held hostage and assaulted in the elevator of her Washington, D.C., apartment building on February 9, 2023. She said of this:

See also
 List of LGBT members of the United States Congress
 Women in the United States House of Representatives

Notes

References

External links

 Congresswoman Angie Craig official U.S. House website
 Campaign website

 

|-

1972 births
21st-century American politicians
Democratic Party members of the United States House of Representatives from Minnesota
Female members of the United States House of Representatives
American Lutherans
Lesbian politicians
LGBT Christians
LGBT Lutherans
LGBT members of the United States Congress
LGBT people from Arkansas
LGBT people from Minnesota
Lutherans from Minnesota
Living people
People from West Helena, Arkansas
University of Memphis alumni
21st-century American women politicians
People from Eagan, Minnesota
21st-century American LGBT people